Randolph Frank Rota (born August 16, 1950) is a Canadian former professional ice hockey player who played 212 games in the National Hockey League and 90 games in the World Hockey Association.  He played for the Montreal Canadiens, Los Angeles Kings, Kansas City Scouts,  Colorado Rockies, and Edmonton Oilers. He was born in Creston, British Columbia and raised in Kamloops, British Columbia.

Rota is the son of Frank and Aldina Rota. Frank Rota was a construction company superintendent, Aldina a homemaker. Frank was also a baseball scout for the St. Louis Cardinals. Randy played the sport and did not begin ice skating until age eight or nine. Randy credits a friend, Norm Jackson, for getting him started in hockey. (Icing On The Plains: The Rough Ride of Kansas City's NHL Scouts, p. 59, Troy Treasure, Balboa Press)

Career statistics

External links
 

1950 births
Living people
Calgary Centennials players
California Golden Seals draft picks
Canadian ice hockey defencemen
Colorado Rockies (NHL) players
Edmonton Oilers (WHA) players
Ice hockey people from British Columbia
Kamloops Rockets players
Kansas City Scouts players
Los Angeles Kings players
Montreal Canadiens players
Nova Scotia Voyageurs players
Oklahoma City Blazers (1965–1977) players
Providence Reds players
Sportspeople from Kamloops

Icing on the Plains: The Rough Ride of Kansas City's NHL Scouts, Troy Treasure, 2018, Balboa Press.